The Magic Kingdom Resort Area includes five resorts located along the shores of the Seven Seas Lagoon and Bay Lake, near the Magic Kingdom at the Walt Disney World Resort. The area began with the opening of Disney's Contemporary Resort, Disney's Polynesian Resort and Disney's Fort Wilderness Resort & Campground. The Walt Disney World Monorail System connects Disney's Contemporary Resort, Disney's Polynesian Village Resort and Disney's Grand Floridian Resort & Spa to the Transportation and Ticket Center and the Magic Kingdom.

Resorts
Disney's Contemporary Resort
Disney's Polynesian Village Resort
Disney's Grand Floridian Resort & Spa
Disney's Wilderness Lodge
Disney's Fort Wilderness Resort & Campground
Shades of Green (Not open to the general public) not owned or operated by the Walt Disney Company
Reflections - A Disney Lakeside Lodge (postponed indefinitely)

Vacation Club Villas
Bay Lake Tower at Disney's Contemporary Resort
Disney's Polynesian Villas & Bungalows
The Villas at Disney's Grand Floridian Resort & Spa
 Boulder Ridge Villas at Disney's Wilderness Lodge
 Copper Creek Villas & Cabins at Disney's Wilderness Lodge
 The Villas at Reflections

Cancelled resorts
Disney's Asian Resort
Disney's Mediterranean Resort
Disney's Persian Resort
Disney's Venetian Resort
Fort Wilderness Junction

See also
Animal Kingdom Resort Area
Disney Springs Resort Area
Epcot Resort Area
ESPN Wide World of Sports Resort Area

References

External links

Disney's Official Resorts Web Page

Hotels in Walt Disney World Resort